Chandi Mandir railway station is a small railway station in Panchkula district, Haryana. Its code is CNDM. It serves Chandimandir Cantonment area of Panchkula city. The station consists of three platforms. The platforms are not well sheltered. It lacks many facilities including water and sanitation.   Chandigarh railway station as well as Chandigarh Airport are the usual air and rail transport hubs for this Chandimandir Cantonment.

Gallery

Major trains 
 Kalka Mail
 Udyan Abha Toofan Express
 Kalka–Barmer Express
 Kalka–Delhi Passenger (unreserved)
 Himalayan Queen Express
 Ekta Express
 Kalka–Ambala Passenger (unreserved)
 Kalka–Shriganganagar Express

References

Railway stations in Panchkula district
Ambala railway division